Landover Mall was a large shopping mall located in Landover, Maryland, directly across from FedExField, off MD 202 and Interstates 95 and 495. The mall was built by Sonny Abramson and Ted Lerner of Lerner Enterprises, and opened in 1972. Like its neighbor, Capital Plaza Mall, it was a major attraction through its opening years in Prince George's County. The mall featured many anchors and smaller tenants; however, upon the decline and closing of its major anchors, the mall itself entered a state of decline. Finally, in 2002, the mall's doors were closed and it ultimately was demolished in 2006. Sears remained open because it owned the land beneath the store. Sears later sold the land underneath its store to Lerner. In January 2014, Sears announced that it would close in March.

Architecture
The mall had three fountains, one adjacent to Hecht's, Sears, and in center court. According to an article in The Washington Post published the day of the mall's grand opening, "The water display consists of seven 3" geysers that are programmed in continuously changing programs of water height (3' to 15') for the perimeter nozzles, and the center nozzle can push the water to a height of 30' if desirable. All splash will be contained in the perimeter six geysers." The main fountain in the mall contained three circular platforms, each representing a loop within the Capital Beltway interchange at Landover Road. During the holiday season the center ring fountains would be shut off and replaced with its annual secular Holiday displays, which featured gingerbread house, fairies, candy canes, snowmen, reindeer, sleigh ride, doves and a "Cupcake Boat Ride", but no Santa or explicit references to Christmas.

History

Prime and downfall

In its prime, Landover Mall had three local department store anchors: Hecht's, Garfinckel's, Woodward & Lothrop (Woodies), and two national chains, Sears and F. W. Woolworth Company. It was the first mall in the region to have four anchors until Fair Oaks Mall opened in 1980. There was a six-screen theater in the basement, which had its own escalators, but it closed in 1991. In 1990, Garfinckel's filed for bankruptcy and went out of business. The former Garfinckel's anchor store was never replaced. Five years later, Woodies went out of business. JCPenney moved into the former Woodies location but found business unprofitable. The store was converted to a JCPenney outlet location in fall 1998 and was closed altogether in early 2001. In early 2002, Hecht's closed after opening a new store at Bowie Town Center in nearby Bowie, Maryland.

Washington DC Business Journal described Landover Mall in 1998 as " dogged since the mid-1980s by perceptions -- real and imagined -- of crime, drugs and violence in nearby communities, like Palmer Park and Seat Pleasant". The article also noted that competition from White Flint Mall and inability to replace vacated stores were factors in its poor reception.

Closure and demolition

After the closure of the main anchors to the mall, Ted Lerner decided to shut the mall down completely. The mall's doors were sealed shut with cinder blocks, although the Sears store remained open.

Demolition began in 2006, and was completed in early 2007. The entire mall was demolished, and its debris was recycled. Sears was the only store that remained open after the mall's closure because it owned the land on which the building stood. However, its former entrances to the mall were sealed shut on both its levels. Sears subsequently sold the land underneath the store to Lerner. In January 2014, Sears announced that it would not renew its lease with Lerner and closed its store in March 2014.

Demolition aftermath

Sears was tentatively planning on relocating to the Ritchie Station Marketplace shopping center on Ritchie Road near Capitol Heights, Maryland. The area of the former mall and parking lot was fenced off and barricaded with cement blocks. The mall's main entrance sign was modified to eliminate its stylized cloverleaf logo shape with the remaining part of the sign and pedestal refurbished to read "Home to Future Development".

Today
In 2014, the FBI announced they were looking at possibly purchasing the land for a future FBI Headquarters after the acquisition of Sears land. Political complications in 2017 undid any progress which had been made and in October 2018, Lerner put the whole site up for sale. In 2022, GSA restarted the search, with the old Landover Mall site being one of three sites under consideration.

Anchors
Hecht's - closed 2002
Garfinckel's - closed 1990
Woodies - closed 1995 and became JCPenney in 1998 which closed in 2001
Sears - closed 2014

References

External links
 Landover Mall at deadmalls.com
 Mall's Comedown Taints Lerner Image

1972 establishments in Maryland
2002 disestablishments in Maryland
Buildings and structures demolished in 2006
Buildings and structures in Prince George's County, Maryland
Demolished buildings and structures in Maryland
Demolished shopping malls in the United States
Shopping malls established in 1972
Shopping malls disestablished in 2002
Shopping malls in Maryland
Shopping malls in the Washington metropolitan area
Tourist attractions in Prince George's County, Maryland